The Neora–Daniyawan–Bihar Sharif–Sheikhpura line is a proposed railway line connecting  on the Howrah–Delhi main line and  on the Gaya–Kiul line both in the Indian state of Bihar.This line will connect  on the Howrah–Delhi main line near , Jatdumri on Patna–Gaya line, Daniyawan on Fatuha–Tilaiya line, Bihar Sharif on Bakhtiyarpur–Tilaiya line and  on Gaya–Kiul line.

History
Neora–Daniyawan–Bihar Sharif–Sheikhpura line was approved in 2002–03 by Indian Railways in order to reduce loads of trains on Danapur–Kiul route of Howrah–Delhi main line. This was considered a very ambitious project in order to improve train operations on Patna–Jhajha–Howrah railway section. The railways have made progress on this project, particularly between the Daniyawan and Barbigha route. The train is running on Bihar Sharif–Daniyawan rail line from 2015. Bihar Sharif–Barbigha and Barbigha–Sheikhpura railway lines are being built. However, they have not made much progress on the route between Neora and Daniyawan due to land acquisition problem.

Electrification
The Daniyawan–Bihar Sharif section was electrified in 2019 and inaugurated on 17 Feb 2019 by PM Narendra Modi.

Important stations

, Daniyawan, Barbigha and Sheikhpura are important stations on this line.

Bihar Sharif is the headquarters of Nalanda district and interchange station for Rajgir and Nalanda, which are popular tourist destinations and are part of the Buddhist Circuit of Bihar. Pawapuri is part of the Jain Circuit of Bihar.

Sections
 Neora–Daniyawan section 
 Daniyawan–Bihar Sharif section 
 Bihar Sharif–Barbigha section 
 Barbigha–Sheikhpura section

Trains
63329/63330 Rajgir–Fatuha MEMU, runs via Bihar Sharif and Daniyawan.

References

See also
 Bakhtiyarpur–Tilaiya line
 Fatuha–Tilaiya line
 Gaya–Kiul line

5 ft 6 in gauge railways in India
Railway lines in Bihar